Massimo Alverà (born 6 August 1957 in Cortina d'Ampezzo, Italy) is an Italian curler.

Teams

References

External links
 

Living people
1957 births
People from Cortina d'Ampezzo
Italian male curlers
Sportspeople from the Province of Belluno